Paul Anderson Duke (September 24, 1924March 24, 2009) was an American football center in the All-America Football Conference. He played for the New York Yankees (1947).

Born in DeKalb County, Georgia, he played collegiately for the Georgia Tech football team and was selected to the All-Southeastern Conference and All-American teams. While at Georgia Tech he was a member of the Chi Phi Fraternity.  He was inducted into the Georgia Tech Hall of Fame in 1963.

External links
Obituary

References

1924 births
2009 deaths
People from Austell, Georgia
Sportspeople from Cobb County, Georgia
Sportspeople from DeKalb County, Georgia
Players of American football from Georgia (U.S. state)
American football centers
Georgia Tech Yellow Jackets football players
All-American college football players
New York Yankees (AAFC) players